The Nakajima Army Type 91 Fighter was a Japanese fighter of the 1930s. It was a single-engine, single-seat parasol monoplane with a fixed, tailwheel undercarriage.

Development
Designed in response to an Army requirement of 1927, the Type 91 was developed from the NC series of fighter prototypes. The prototype was the sixth machine under that designation but was a fundamentally distinct airframe design. Compared to the earlier NC, the Type 91 had a smaller wing, relocated fuel tank and wing-bracing struts, Townend ring-type cowling, new design tail and undercarriage. It first flew in 1931.

Operational history
The Army ordered the new aircraft as the Nakajima Army Type 91 Fighter and the first deliveries took place late in 1931. However, issues arose with both directional stability and centre of gravity, with the result that the type was delayed entering service.

Between 1931 and 1934, 420 aircraft were constructed (including 100 by Ishikawajima; 23 of the total were Type 91-2, powered by a 432 kW (580 hp) Nakajima Kotobuki 2 radial engine. This version first flew in July 1934.

The Type was supplanted in service by the Kawasaki Army Type 95 Fighter in 1936–1937.

Variants
Nakajima NC
prototype & pre-serie version, powered by 336 kW (450 hp) Jupiter radial engine, having a top speed of 268 km/h and larger wing. 8 built.
Nakajima Army Type 91-1 Fighter
Main production version, powered by 336 kW - 390 kW (450 hp - 520 hp) Nakajima built Jupiter radial engine.
Nakajima Army Type 91-2 Fighter
Improved version, powered by Nakajima Kotobuki. 21 built.

Operators

The Chinese Nationalist Air Force purchased 12 Type 91-1 fighters which would later end up fighting against the Japanese during the Second Sino-Japanese War.

Imperial Japanese Army Air Force

Manchukuo Imperial Air Force

Survivors

The Tokorozawa Aviation Museum in Tokorozawa, Saitama has a fuselage on display. Also, at a gate of Yanagisawa Shrine in Yamatokōriyama in Nara Prefecture there is a propeller preserved.

Specifications (Nakajima Army Type 91-1 Fighter)

References

Bibliography

Type 91, Nakajima
High-wing aircraft
Type 91
Single-engined tractor aircraft